Elaine Edwards (1929–2018) was an American politician.

Elaine Edwards may also refer to:
 Elaine Edwards (actress), actress who was in Three Blondes in His Life 
 Elaine Edwards, actress who was in Fiddler on the Roof
 Elaine Edwards, a character in The Bondage